John Marshall Warwick House is a historic home located at Lynchburg, Virginia.  It was built in 1826 by prominent Lynchburg tobacconist and city mayor (1833), John Marshall Warwick. It was one of the first houses to be built on the crest of Lynchburg Hill, later to be called Court House Hill, overlooking the James River. It exhibits the transition from the Federal to the Greek Revival styles.  His grandson, United States Senator John Warwick Daniel was born in this home.

It was listed on the National Register of Historic Places in 1996.  It is located in the Court House Hill-Downtown Historic District.

Gallery

References

External links
John Marshall Warwick House, Eighth & Court Streets, Lynchburg, VA: 1 photos, 1 data page, and 1 photo caption page, at Historic American Buildings Survey

Historic American Buildings Survey in Virginia
Houses on the National Register of Historic Places in Virginia
Houses in Lynchburg, Virginia
Federal architecture in Virginia
Houses completed in 1826
Greek Revival houses in Virginia
National Register of Historic Places in Lynchburg, Virginia
Individually listed contributing properties to historic districts on the National Register in Virginia
1826 establishments in Virginia